is a Japanese voice actress and singer.

Filmography

Television animation
2001
Parappa the Rapper (Paula)
Angel Tales (Tanuki no Midori)

2002
Digimon Frontier (Nyaromon)
Shin Megami Tensei Devil Children: Light & Dark (Ishitoku)

2003
Tenshi no Shippo Chu! (Raccoon Midori)

2004
Legendz: Yomigaeru Ryuuou Densetsu (Dr. Conrad)
The Marshmallow Times (Basil)
Get Ride! Amdriver (June Frum)

2005
Pandalian (Diddy, Bingo)
Onegai My Melody (Nyanmi)
Zettai Shonen (Kisa Tanigawa)
Ginga Densetsu Weed (Mel)

2006
Ballad of a Shinigami (Momo)
Onegai My Melody: Kuru Kuru Shuffle! (Nyanmi)
Inukami! (Tenso)
Save Me! Lollipop (Zura)
Fairy Musketeers (Randagio)
Galaxy Angel Rune (Mimoret)
Lovedol ~Lovely Idol~ (Hibiki Asami)

2007
Onegai My Melody: Sukkiri (Nyanmi)

2008
Onegai My Melody: Kirara (Nyanmi)

2009
Cookin' Idol I! My! Mine! (Misan)
Jewelpet (Aojiso)

External links 
 

1979 births
Living people
Voice actresses from Yokohama
Japanese voice actresses
Musicians from Kanagawa Prefecture
21st-century Japanese singers
21st-century Japanese women singers